Vengayil Kunhiraman Nayanar (1860 – 14 November 1914) was a Malayali essayist and short story writer, and a prominent landlord of Malabar district.

Vengayil family
Nayanar was born in an aristocratic Nair family known as "Vengayil" in Chirackal Thaluk, Northern part of Malabar district in British India. The Vengayil Nayanar tharavad were a significant land-owning family of Malabar district in the 1800s in British India. They, at the time, owned more than 200,000 acres (810 km square) of land including vast forest lands. The land directly under the ownership of the Vengayil family was comparable to the size of the 13-gun salute princely state of Kapurthala State (352 square miles (910 km2)), and 11-gun salute Morvi State (242 square miles (630 km2)).

Early life and education
Kunhiraman Nayanar was born to Vengayil Kunhakkam Amma and Puliyappadappu Haridasan Somayajipad, a Nambudiri Brahmin from Perinchellor Graamam, Taliparamba. His early education was in Sanskrit, and later joined the English school at Taliparamba, followed by the Saidampetta Agricultural College in Calicut. In 1904 he became a member of the Malabar District Board, and in 1917 was elected to the Madras Legislative Assembly. He died while serving as a member there on 14 November 1914, aged 54.

Literature
Nayanar came to the literary world through Kerala Pathrika (started in 1884 by C. Kunhiraman Menon (1854–1936) and Appu Nedungadi (1860–1934) at Calicut). He was also closely associated with periodicals like Vidya Vinodini (started in 1889 at Trichur under the editorship of C. P. Achutha Menon), Kerala Chandrika (started in 1879 at Trivandrum), Kerala Sanchari (after 1898 under the editorship of Murkoth Kumaran), Kerala Pathrika and the English Journal Malabar Spectator. He wrote the first Malayalam short story, Vasanavikriti. Under the pen names "Kesari", "Vajrasoochi","Vajrabahu", Vengayil Kunhiraman Nayanar's works obtained wide appreciation from all over South India. Kesari was a sharp critic of social reality, criticising social inequalities. He was also a close friend of Dr. Hermann Gundert and William Logan who did a lot of research on the history, language, and culture of Kerala.

Family
Vengayil Nayanar's grandson was K. P. Candeth, a Lieutenant General in the Indian Army and first Governor of Goa. His son was A. C. N. Nambiar, an Indian Nationalist and involved with the Indian Legion during the Second World War.

Works
Some of Vengayil Kunhiraman Nayanar's works are lost. Most of his works were published in periodicals such as Vidya Vinodini, Saraswathi and Kerala Pathrika. Some of his works are compiled by Prof. K. Gopalakrishnan and published by Mathrubhumi under the title Kesari Nayanarude Krithikal.
 Stories
 
 
 
 
 
 
 
 

 Essays on literature
 
 
 
 
 
 
 
 
 

 Essays on culture
 
 

 Essays on agriculture
 
 
 
 

 Miscellaneous
 
 
 
 
 
 Vengayil Kunhiraman Nayanar (1909). Introduction. In: Kottarathil Sankunni. Aithihyamala Part 1.
 Vengayil Kunhiraman Nayanar (1914). Introduction. In: Kottarathil Sankunni. Aithihyamala Part 2.

See also
"Kesari" A. Balakrishna Pillai was a critic who was also known by the pseudonym "Kesari".
Madayi Kavu
Malayalam

References

External links 
Payyanur.com, "History"
KSD.kerala.gov.in, "History of Kasaragod"
PRD.kerala.gov.in, "The Essay"
 PRD.kerala.gov.in, "History of Press in India"
Rediff.com, "Nayanars of Kerala"

Malayali people
Malayalam-language writers
Malayalam short story writers
1861 births
1914 deaths
20th-century Indian short story writers
19th-century Indian short story writers
Indian male short story writers
Indian male essayists
Writers from Kerala
Indian male journalists
20th-century Indian essayists
19th-century Indian essayists
19th-century Indian male writers
20th-century Indian male writers